Opera in the Domain presented by Opera Australia is an open-air concert held in the Phillip Precinct of the Royal Botanical Gardens, Sydney. Every January, thousands of Sydneysiders flock to The Domain for a night of free opera. The event itself has been running since 2000 and since 2005 has been sponsored by Mazda Australia, adopting its new name Mazda Opera in the Domain. Former MP Kevin Rudd described the event as "One of the most popular open-air events in Australia", and former Prime Minister Julia Gillard earlier this year said "Opera in the Domain is such a loved and enduring part of Australia's cultural landscape". 

In 2011, Opera Australia for the first time presented the crowd favorite Carmen which attracted over 40,000 people, almost bringing the Phillip Precinct to capacity.

"Opera in the Domain" was preceded by "Opera in the Park" which commenced in 1982 with La Traviata starring Dame Joan Surtherland. Sutherland also sang the next five Operas in the Park, ensuring massive crowds.

List of Performances

Festivals in Sydney
Music festivals in Australia